John Curran (born 17 June 1960) is a former Irish Fianna Fáil politician who served Chair of the Committee on Housing and Homelessness from 2016 to 2020 and a Minister of State from 2008 to 2011. He served as a Teachta Dála (TD) for the Dublin Mid-West constituency from 2002 to 2011 and 2016 to 2020.

Following his re-election in 2016, he chaired the all-party Oireachtas Housing and Homelessness Committee. This committee launched their final report on 17 June 2016.

Curran was elected to South Dublin County Council at the 1999 local elections representing the Clondalkin–Newcastle local electoral area. He was first elected to Dáil Éireann at the 2002 general election when the constituency was first created. He was re-elected on the first count at the 2007 general election.

On 13 May 2008, shortly after Brian Cowen became Taoiseach, he was appointed as Minister of State at the Department of Community, Rural and Gaeltacht Affairs with special responsibility for the National Drugs Strategy and Community Affairs. On 22 April 2009, he was reassigned within the same department, and also as Minister of State at the Department of Education and Science and at the Department of Justice, Equality and Law Reform, with responsibility for integration policy.

On 23 March 2010 he was appointed as Minister of State at the Department of the Taoiseach with responsibility as Government Chief Whip and Minister of State at the Department of Defence.

He lost his seat at the 2011 general election, but regained it in the 2016 general election. He then chaired the All-Party Oireachtas Social Protection Committee. He lost his seat again at the 2020 general election.

In December 2022, he was named as one of the members of the Electoral Commission which is due to be established in early 2023.

References

1960 births
Living people
Alumni of University College Dublin
Fianna Fáil TDs
Government Chief Whip (Ireland)
Local councillors in South Dublin (county)
Members of the 29th Dáil
Members of the 30th Dáil
Members of the 32nd Dáil
Ministers of State of the 30th Dáil